During World War II, Operation Abercrombie was an Anglo-Canadian reconnaissance raid on the area around the French coastal village of Hardelot, located south of Boulogne-sur-Mer, in the Pas-de-Calais. It had been scheduled for the night of 19/20 April 1942, but delayed until 21/22 April. The raid was largely unopposed but, on review, the benefits were thought not to have been worth the effort. Due to a navigation error the Canadian detachment lost their way and had to abort.

Objectives
The operation was a reconnaissance in force, intended to reconnoitre the beaches off the village of Hardelot, to capture prisoners and destroy as much equipment as possible, including a searchlight battery.

Preparation and plans
The force comprised B and C troops (about 100 men) of No. 4 Commando, 50 men from the Canadian Carleton and York Regiment, (2nd Canadian Infantry Brigade) and some Royal Engineers, under the overall command of Major The Lord Lovat of No.4 Commando.

The Commandos trained in the New Forest and Lepe, near Southampton, based aboard the landing ship, HMS Prince Albert on which they were transported to Dover on 18 April. The force was to be carried to France on motor gun boats (MGBs) and there transferred to assault landing craft (LCAs), which the MGBs had towed.

C Troop was to land first, clear obstacles and establish a beachhead; B Troop would pass through C Troop, head inland and execute their tasks. The return journey would be in the LCAs.

Raid
This was the first occasion the new LCS (Landing Craft Support) was employed, equipped with two machine guns and a mortar.

The convoy of MGBs and LCAs set off on the evening of April 19 but after two hours, an LCA took on water and sank. The two crewmen were recovered but two commandos who had manned a Bren gun were lost and after the search was abandoned the force returned to Dover. A second attempt was made on April 21, with a replacement LCA. The Canadian detachment experienced navigational problems and became separated, eventually attracting tracer fire from the shore returned by their accompanying MGBs (Motor Gun Boats). No Canadian troops disembarked. The Commandos landed further north than intended but were unopposed and escaped detection until among the deep sand dunes and wire entanglements. Support fire from the LCSs partially suppressed moderate German tracer fire from the flanks and the commandos were able to progress.

Defences were found to be light and/or abandoned as they advanced and only three Germans were encountered at close quarters who withdrew immediately. The official report recorded, "no determined opposition". A fighting patrol of 12 men sent to destroy the searchlights reached their objective but had to retire before pressing home their attack due to lack of time remaining signaled by the re-call rocket.

The only Allied casualty was a commando who was shot through the ankles after failing to respond to a beachhead sentry's challenge quickly enough. Supporting Navy craft encountered and engaged enemy vessels, including E Boats, sinking at least one and damaging others, for three naval casualties. Enemy casualties were unknown.

Review
Experience of the operation contributed towards Operation Jubilee, the major Combined Operations raid on Dieppe, France, the following August.

References

Conflicts in 1942
Battles of World War II involving Canada
Military operations of World War II involving Germany
World War II in the Pas-de-Calais
World War II British Commando raids
Amphibious operations of World War II
Amphibious operations involving the United Kingdom
Amphibious operations involving Canada